The J. W. Carey House, a  Queen Anne style house built in 1895, is located west of Prosser, Washington, United States.

The House was built in 1895 by J. W. Carey, (an agent of the Northern Pacific Railroad) on land originally subdivided by the Prosser Falls Irrigation Company for small orchards. The land reverted to PFIC the next year, and was sold at auction to future United States Senator Levi Ankeny, who held the house until 1903.

The house is one of the best examples of residential architecture from Prosser's initial boom.  It has been listed on the National Register of Historic Places since 1989. The House is currently a private residence.

References

Queen Anne architecture in Washington (state)
Houses completed in 1895
Houses on the National Register of Historic Places in Washington (state)
National Register of Historic Places in Benton County, Washington
1895 establishments in Washington (state)